Serú Girán is the debut album by the eponymous band, brainchild of Charly García (his fourth and last band). It was recorded partly in Brazil and in the United States, and was released in 1978.

Although initially poorly received by critics and fans, in part due to its unconventional symphonic rock influences, the album is now considered one of the finest progressive rock albums in Spanish, containing many Argentine rock standards.

Track listing
Side one
"Eiti Leda" - 7:05
"El Mendigo en el Andén" [The Beggar in the Platform] (David Lebón, Charly García) - 3:53
"Separata" - 1:36
"Autos, Jets, Aviones, Barcos" [Cars, Jets, Planes and Boats] - 4:15
Side two
"Serú-Girán" - 6:55
"Seminare" - 3:27
"Voy a Mil" (David Lebón, Charly García) - 3:06
"Cosmigonon" (David Lebón) - 1:33
All songs written and composed by Charly García, except where noted.

Personnel
Charly García – piano, Yamaha CP-70 Electric grand piano, Minimoog, string synthesizer, acoustic guitar, lead vocal
David Lebón – electric guitar, acoustic guitar, lead vocal
Pedro Aznar – electric and fretless bass, backing vocals
Oscar Moro – drums, percussion

1978 debut albums
Serú Girán albums